The following is a list of high schools in Turkey, categorised by province:

Adana
Adana Fen Lisesi
Seyhan Rotary Anadolu Lisesi
Hümeyra Ökte Kız Anadolu Lisesi

Ankara
Ankara Fen Lisesi
Ankara (Anadolu) Lisesi
Ankara Atatürk Anadolu Lisesi
Ankara Atatürk Lisesi
Ankara Elementary/High School
Ankara Milli Piyango Anadolu Lisesi
Gazi Anadolu Lisesi
TED Ankara Koleji
TVF Fine Arts and Sports High School
Ayrancı Anadolu Lisesi
Dr. Binnaz Ege-Dr. Rıdvan Ege Anadolu Lisesi
Hacı Ömer Tarman Anadolu Lisesi
Betül Can Anadolu Lisesi
Ankara Pursaklar Fen Lisesi
Cumhuriyet Fen Lisesi
Özkent Akbilek Fen Lisesi
Polatlı TOBB Fen Lisesi
Ankara Türk Telekom Sosyal Bilimler Lisesi

Antalya
Aksu Anadolu Öğretmen Lisesi

Balıkesir
 Balıkesir Lisesi
 Sırrı Yırcalı Anadolu Lisesi
 Ülkü Muharrem Ertaş Anadolu Lisesi

Bursa
 Tofaş Fen Lisesi
 Bursa Anadolu Lisesi
 Ulubatlı Hasan Anadolu Lisesi
 Osmangazi Gazi Anadolu Lisesi
 Bursa Anadolu Erkek Lisesi
 Bursa Anadolu Kız Lisesi
Bursa Sports High School
 Ahmet Erdem Anadolu Lisesi
 Yıldırım Beyazıt Anadolu Lisesi
 Çamlıca Anadolu Lisesi
 Özlüce Anadolu Lisesi
 Bursa Erkek Lisesi

Edirne
 Beykent Educational Institutions
 Özel Edirne Beykent Anadolu Lisesi
 Özel Edirne Beykent Fen Lisesi

Gaziantep
Gaziantep Fen Lisesi

Isparta
 Mürşide Ermumcu Anadolu Öğretmen Lisesi

İstanbul

İzmir
 Bornova Anadolu Lisesi
 İzmir Atatürk Lisesi
 İzmir Fen Lisesi
 American Collegiate Institute
 Lycée Saint-Joseph, İzmir
 Namık Kemal High School
 Özel Ege Lisesi
 Karşıyaka Lisesi
 İzmir Özel Türk Koleji
 İzmir Kız Lisesi
 Şemikler Lisesi

Kayseri
 TED Kayseri Koleji

Kocaeli
 Gölcük Barbaros Hayrettin Lisesi
 TEV İnanç Türkeş Özel Lisesi
 Cahit Elginkan Anadolu Lisesi
 Darıca Fen Lisesi
 Gebze Kanuni Sosyal Bilimler Lisesi 
Kartepe Ali Fuat Başgil Sosyal Bilimler Lisesi

Malatya
 Malatya Science High School

Mersin
 İçel Anadolu Lisesi
 Silifke Göksu Anadolu Lisesi
 Tevfik Sırrı Gür Anadolu Lisesi
 Yusuf Kalkavan Anadolu Lisesi
 Yenice Çağ Private High School

Samsun
 Samsun Atatürk Anatolian High School

Tokat
 Tokat Arif Nihat Asya Lisesi

Yalova
 Şehit Osman Altınkuyu Anadolu Lisesi
 Yalova Fatih Sultan Mehmet Anadolu Lisesi

Zonguldak
Ereğli Özel Yıldırım Lisesi

Former schools

 Edirne (Adrianople)
 Bulgarian Men's High School of Adrianople
 Elazig (Mamuret-ul-Aziz)
 Euphrates College
 Istanbul (Constantinople)
 Great National School (Megalē tou Genous scholē)
 Zappeion - Established in 1875, it was a school for girls catering to the Greek population. , an ethnic Turk, attended this school. Johann Strauss, author of "Language and power in the late Ottoman Empire," described it as "prestigious".
 İzmir (Smyrna)
 American Boys’ School
 Merzifon
 Anatolia College in Merzifon

See also
 Anatolian High School
 Education in Turkey
 List of missionary schools in Turkey

References

High schools

High